Aansoo Ban Gaye Phool is a 1969 Hindi movie directed by Satyen Bose. The film stars Ashok Kumar, Nirupa Roy, Pran, Helen, Deb Mukherjee and Alka in lead roles. The music is by Laxmikant-Pyarelal. Penned by Taj Bhopali and Govind Munees. It is based on the Marathi play Ashroonchi Zhali Phule.

Cast
 Deb Mukherjee as CBI Inspector Chandrashekhar
 Alka as Krishna
 Ashok Kumar as Professor Vidyanand
 Nirupa Roy as Dr. Sumitra
 Pran as Shambhu Mahadev Rao
 Helen as Neelam

Soundtrack

Awards 
Filmfare Best Supporting Actor Award for Pran
Filmfare Best Story Award for Vasant Kanetkar

References

External links 
 

1969 films
1960s Hindi-language films
Films scored by Laxmikant–Pyarelal
Films directed by Satyen Bose
Indian films based on plays